DJ Sharpnel is a Japanese music duo composed of Jea and Lemmy, who are signed under their independent record label Sharpnelsound. They are credited for pioneering the J-core genre, recognized for their speedcore, gabber, happy hardcore and trance productions.

History

Beginnings and style 
The beginnings of DJ Sharpnel came in 1996 when Jea joined up with Project Gabbangelion and later released the album "sharpnel vs Project Gabbangelion" in 1998. DJ Sharpnel's active contribution to the Japanese underground hardcore techno scene has helped form a new genre of music known as J-core. Although DJ Sharpnel never describes Lemmy as a DJ or producer, she has created several songs, such as those listed on SRPC-0004. The style of DJ Sharpnel’s music differs from that of other hardcore artists. Its aggressive overtones are often brightened up with sped-up Japanese popular music or spoken voice samples from various anime. These are also often fused with more Western influences, such as lyrics from American hip hop music and cartoons.

Much of the sales of Sharpnel Sound records, as well as management of the hardrave online radio station and promotion of Sharpnelsound events, is done through Guhroovy, a primarily-hardcore record store located in Shibuya and operated by Akira Uchibori (Guhroovy). Aside from their prolific discography on the Sharpnelsound label, DJ Sharpnel has also provided tracks for other Japanese labels such as Maddest Chickn’dom, Ravin Beatz Japan, and Gabba Disco.

Aliases 
DJ Sharpnel has used various artist names throughout their releases, depending on the specific style of the track or album. The main aliases are "DJ Sharpnel" (standard hardcore and happy hardcore style, with Lemmy) and "Killingscum" (terrorcore, speedcore, and breakcore style, with just Jea). Sharpnel.net is the name for the collaborative "performance project" of the Sharpnelsound label, with Jea as live DJ and Lemmy as live VJ. Although, according to their MySpace page, DJ Sharpnel is the name on the produced albums, Killingscum is occasionally credited to tracks, separating Jea from Lemmy. In addition to Killingscum, Jea also uses "DJ Jea" as a solo alias when he performs hardstyle music and tracks related to the SPRH series.

Other group aliases have been used when Jea and Lemmy collaborated with other artists prior to the creation of the DJ Sharpnel name, such as Project Gabbangelion (which included Jea, Viscion, and Tangion) and High Speed Music Team Sharpnel (which included Jea, La-Quebrata, Jun-Q, Quebradora, and Lemmy). Still other albums are credited to "DJ Sharpnel & V.A" indicating that various other artists produced tracks on the album.

The name "DJ Sharpnel" is commonly used to refer to any combination of musicians led by Jea (with or without Lemmy), even those prior to 2000 and those on albums not associated with the Sharpnelsound label.

Influence 
Due to DJ Sharpnel's extended time and dedication to the J-Core music scene (as well as the increased popularity of anime in the West), Western recognition of Japanese hardcore has increased. Many up-and-coming new music artists have acknowledged DJ Sharpnel's influence, including DJ Zaiaku, T2Kazuya, Spy47 and Shingo DJ.

Discography 
DJ Sharpnel's discography is very large, tallying to over 53 albums in which the duo has contributed to (most likely not together at all times) and at least 10 albums in which they are the primary or sole contributor. Below is the primary discography associated with the Sharpnelsound label, with DJ Sharpnel as the primary artist (albeit with varying aliases used throughout). For most albums in the SRPC series, there are two versions. First, a CDr version released at Comiket, then later a pressed CD version to be sold at shops. The CDr versions are produced in smaller quantities and are therefore rarer, and usually have a track list differing somewhat from the final pressed version.

See also
Hardcore Techno
J-core

References

 ^ "Sharpnelsound Other Works". http://www.sharpnel.com/otherworks.htm.
 ^ "DJ Sharpnel discography". http://www.sharpnel.com/rel/rel.htm.
 ^ a b c d ".:DR. Freecloud's Record Shoppe:.". https://web.archive.org/web/20110815062505/http://drfreeclouds.com/search.php?search_text=SRPC.

External links
 Official DJ Sharpnel Website
 DJ Sharpnel Discogs entry
 DJ Sharpnel at MySpace

Happy hardcore musicians
J-pop
Japanese DJs
Japanese pop music groups
Electronic dance music duos